Luka Žinko (born 23 March 1983) is a Slovenian football midfielder who plays for Brinje Grosuplje.

Club career

Gabala
In January 2013, Žinko signed a six-month contract, with the option of another year, with Azerbaijan Premier League team Gabala. He scored his first goal for Gabala on his debut against Qarabağ. Žinko left Gabala in May 2013 at the end of his contract. He had scored one goal in eight appearances.

Hangzhou Greentown
On 14 June 2013, Žinko signed for Chinese Super League side Hangzhou Greentown. Žinko scored for Hangzhou Greentown on his debut in a 2–2 draw away to Changchun Yatai on 6 July 2013.

Career statistics

Honours

Domžale
Slovenian PrvaLiga: 2006–07, 2007–08
Slovenian Cup: 2016–17
Slovenian Supercup: 2007

References

External links
 
 Luka Žinko at NZS 
 
 

1983 births
Living people
Footballers from Ljubljana
Slovenian footballers
Association football midfielders
Slovenian expatriate footballers
NK IB 1975 Ljubljana players
NK Šmartno ob Paki players
FC Istres players
NK Bela Krajina players
NK Domžale players
Kocaelispor footballers
APOP Kinyras FC players
FC Amkar Perm players
Alki Larnaca FC players
NK Rudar Velenje players
Gabala FC players
Zhejiang Professional F.C. players
NK Olimpija Ljubljana (2005) players
NK Krško players
NK Celje players
NK Bravo players
Slovenian PrvaLiga players
Slovenian Second League players
Süper Lig players
Cypriot First Division players
Russian Premier League players
Azerbaijan Premier League players
Chinese Super League players
Expatriate footballers in France
Expatriate footballers in Turkey
Expatriate footballers in Cyprus
Expatriate footballers in Russia
Expatriate footballers in Azerbaijan
Expatriate footballers in China
Slovenian expatriate sportspeople in France
Slovenian expatriate sportspeople in Turkey
Slovenian expatriate sportspeople in Cyprus
Slovenian expatriate sportspeople in Russia
Slovenian expatriate sportspeople in Azerbaijan
Slovenian expatriate sportspeople in China
Slovenia youth international footballers
Slovenia under-21 international footballers
Slovenia international footballers